Josué Villae (born 17 May 1975) is a Venezuelan model and actor.

Career
He began his career by participating in several theater plays. He rose to fame by participating in the Mister Venezuela competition in 2000 where he was one of the finalists. Since then, he has participated in various telenovelas on Venezuelan channel Venevisión.

In 2013, Josué joined the cast for the upcoming telenovela Corazón Esmeralda

Telenovelas

References

External links

Ql actor Josue Villaé

Living people
1975 births
Male beauty pageant winners
Venezuelan male models
Venezuelan male telenovela actors